Comic King is a 2000 Hong Kong comedy film directed by O Sing-Pui. It was shown in cinemas from 19 January 2001 to 21 February 2001.

Synopsis
A romantic triangle turns fantasy into reality in this comedy from Hong Kong. Fung Yip (Julian Cheung) and Mo Wan (Eason Chan) are a pair of young cartoonists who have been hired by a comic book publisher to help write and draw a new superhero comic. Both Fung Yip and Mo Wan become seriously infatuated with Mandy (Ruby Lin), a beautiful girl who works in the office, and as the friends become rivals for her affections, their characters become increasingly contentious; in time, the superheroes they've created come to life and begin settling their differences using their fighting skills. Nicholas Tse also appears in a dual role as the two rival comic book heroes.

Cast
Julian Cheung as Yip Fung
Ruby Lin as Mandy
Nicholas Tse as Ting Fung
Eason Chan as Mo Wan
Hacken Lee as Young Lo
Liu Wai-hung
Spencer Lam as Newsstand vendor
Jerry Lamb as Comic book villain
Tats Lau Yi-Dat as Comic book hero
Helena Law Lan as Queen of Mahjong

External links
 hkmdb.com
 

2000s Cantonese-language films
2001 films
2001 comedy films
Hong Kong comedy films
2000s Hong Kong films